Defending champions Martina Navratilova and Pam Shriver successfully defended their title, defeating Anne Hobbs and Wendy Turnbull in the final, 6–4, 6–7, 6–2 to win the women's doubles tennis title at the 1983 Australian Open.

Seeds
Champion seeds are indicated in bold text while text in italics indicates the round in which those seeds were eliminated.

Draw

Final

Top half

Bottom half

External links
 1983 Australian Open – Women's draws and results at the International Tennis Federation

Women's Doubles
Australian Open (tennis) by year – Women's doubles